Society for the Encouragement of Fine Arts can refer to:

 the Society for the Encouragement of Fine Arts, a predecessor of the University of Cumbria
 the Society for the Encouragement of Fine Arts in Warsaw, a Polish arts organization in Warsaw